The Cyclopedia Talislanta is a supplement published by Bard Games in 1988 for the fantasy role-playing game Talislanta.

Contents
The Cyclopedia Talislanta, by Stephan Michael Sechi and with cover art by P.D. Breeding-Black, is the fifth supplement about the world of Talislanta. Information includes
 places of interest in Talislanta 
 new monsters, animals, and plants 
 New character types
 new skills and abilities 

There are full-color maps of sections of Talislanta which join together to create a full map of the continent.

Reception
Stewart Wieck reviewed The Cyclopedia Talislanta for White Wolf #14, rating it 4 overall, and stated that "Ownership of this book is a necessity for gamers with campaigns set in Talislanta. Other gamers should take a look just to see what Talislanta offers."

In the May 1989 edition of Dragon (Issue #145), Jim Bambra applauded the "excellent interior illustrations", and the wide range of new material. He concluded "GMs and players who already adventure in Talislanta or use it as a source of ideas will find plenty of interesting material within this books pages, as it adds more interesting detail and color to the setting."

In the July-August 1989 edition of Space Gamer (Vol. II No. 1), Craig Sheeley commented that "The encyclopedia-style information is listed alphabetically, a minor drawback which spreads specific places in the same areas throughout this section. The section new character race types is brief and concise, as is the gamemaster section (which takes up two pages with new weapons, skills and information.)"

References

Role-playing game supplements introduced in 1988
Talislanta supplements